This is a list of historical events and publications of Australian literature during 2023.

Major publications

Literary fiction 

 Gregory Day, The Bell of the World
 Fiona McIntosh, Dead Tide

Short story collections 

 Graeme Simsion, Creative Differences and other stories

Non-Fiction 
 Margaret Simons, Tanya Plibersek: On Her Own Terms

Poetry 

 Stuart Barnes, Like to the Lark
 John Kinsella, Harsh Hakea: Collected Poems Volume Two (2005–2014)
 David McCooey, The Book of Falling

Awards and honours 
Note: these awards were presented in the year in question.

Lifetime achievement

Fiction

Children and Young Adult

Non-Fiction

Poetry

Drama

Deaths 

21 January – Gabrielle Williams, author of young adult fiction (born 1963)

See also 

 2023 in Australia
 2023 in literature
 2023 in poetry
 List of years in Australian literature
 List of years in literature

References 

2023 in Australia
Australian literature by year
Years of the 21st century in Australia
Years of the 21st century in literature